Wuwei Confucius Temple, or Wuwei Confucian Temple, is a Confucian temple located in Liangzhou District, Wuwei City, Gansu Province.  It is the largest Confucian temple in Northwest China in terms of scale of construction,  covering an area of 15,300 square meters.

Wuwei Confucius Temple complex is divided into two sections: the Confucius Temple and the Wenchang Hall. The Temple was hailed as the "Crown of Longyou Academy" (陇右学宫之冠) during the Ming Dynasty and Qing Dynasty.

History
Wuwei Confucius Temple was built in the 2nd to 4th year of Zhengtong of the Ming Dynasty (1437-1439),  and was rebuilt and expanded several times during Chenghua, Shunzhi, Kangxi, Qianlong, Daoguang and the Republic of China.

Conservation
In 1996, Wuwei Confucius Temple was listed as the fourth batch of Major Historical and Cultural Site Protected at the National Level in China.

References

Confucian temples in China
Ming dynasty architecture
15th-century establishments in China
15th-century Confucian temples
Major National Historical and Cultural Sites in Gansu
Wuwei, Gansu